The Institute of Psychiatry and Human Behavior, Bambolim, Goa, India is a psychiatric hospital and part of the Goa Medical College (GMC).  It deals with the treatment and investigation of mentally ill patients. Posting students in clinics and interns, as a part of the MBBS course, is also done here. It is approximately a kilometer away from GMC opposite Bambolim Church, a landmark.

Services
The IPHB primarily seeks to provide preventive, curative and rehabilitative mental health services to the people of Goa and its neighbouring states such as Maharashtra and Karnataka.

The bed strength of the hospital was 190 beds. IPHB has closed wards as well as open wards for male and female patients separately. In open wards patients have to be accompanied by relatives or caretakers.

References

Psychiatry organizations
Education in North Goa district
Psychology organizations
Mental health organisations in India
Psychiatric hospitals in India
1980 establishments in Goa, Daman and Diu
 Health in Goa